Goshu Zewde of Gojjam (1783 or 1788-1852) was the governor of Damot, Metcha and Ybaba; most of Gojjam was, indeed, under the government of his son Birru Goshu.

He was elevated to the personal titles of Dejazmach in 1825 and Ras by Emperor Sahle Dengel in 1848.

Goshu Zewde belonged through his mother, Woizero Dinnkénech to the imperial family: she was the granddaughter of Walata Israel, daughter of Empress Mentewab by her first husband and half-sister of Emperor Iyasu II. His father, the Dejazmach Zewde, Governor of Damot, had died captive of Ras Gugsa, against whom he had fought for several years. The Dejazmach Goshu, although reduced to the government of Damot, Metcha and Ybaba, was still formidable. Princes, churchmen and farmers all held him in high esteem, as much for his high birth as for the goodness of his character.

Lik Atskoum, a scholarly high dignitary who was one of the four great imperial judges of Ethiopia, describes Goshu as a great ruler:

The French explorer Arnaud d'Abbadie, who was a close friend of the Goshu described him thus:

Dejazmach Goshu was a governor loyal to Ras Ali; he actively participated in many battles during the "Zemene Mesafint". However, he found death during the Battle of Gur Amba against the troops of Kassa Hailu future Tewodros II.

Family 
Dejazmach Goshu had two sons: Dejazmach Birru Goshu; and Dejazmach Tessemma Goshu, who was the father of Adal, who later took the name of Negus Tekle Haymanot.

References 

1783 births
1852 deaths
19th-century Ethiopian people
Warlords of the Zemene Mesafint
History of Ethiopia